Marc Simmons (born May 15, 1937 in Texas) is a historian who specializes in the history of the U.S. state of New Mexico.  As an independent scholar, he is credited by the University of New Mexico Press with publishing at least 42 books and numerous articles on the history of his home state, with particular reference to the heritage of Native American, Spanish Colonial, and Mexican Colonial elements within this overall history.

Biography
Simmons emigrated from Texas to New Mexico at an early age, pursuing a passionate attachment to the Land of Enchantment and its horse culture.  He studied history at the University of New Mexico and ranch life from New Mexicans, and reporter Howard Houghton said Simmons “may have been the only working farrier around with a Ph.D.”  In 1980, Simmons was awarded a Guggenheim Fellowship in U.S. history.   From 2000 until 2016, Simmons wrote a weekly column for the Santa Fe New Mexican.  Phyllis Morgan has published a biographical essay and bibliography of Simmons's work.  

Simmons has, since 2008, donated his papers to an archive in the Wittliff Collections at Texas State University.

References

1937 births
American historians
Living people